is a train station on the Hankyu Railway Kyoto Line located in Takatsuki, Osaka Prefecture, Japan.

Lines
Hankyu Railway
Kyōto Main Line

Layout

History 
Tonda station opened on 16 January 1928.

Station numbering was introduced to all Hankyu stations on 21 December 2013 with this station being designated as station number HK-71.

Stations next to Tonda

References

External links
 Tonda Station from Hankyu Railway website

Hankyu Kyoto Main Line
Railway stations in Osaka Prefecture
Railway stations in Japan opened in 1928